KES College (Greek: Κολλέγιο ΚΕΣ) is a college in Cyprus founded in 1971.

External links
 Cyprus Ministry of Education

Universities and colleges in Cyprus
Educational institutions established in 1971
1971 establishments in Cyprus